Nicklas Bäckström (born 23 November 1987) is a Swedish professional ice hockey centre and alternate captain for the Washington Capitals of the National Hockey League (NHL). Bäckström was selected fourth overall by the Capitals at the 2006 NHL Entry Draft.

Bäckström is renowned for his elite playmaking abilities, earning him a reputation as one of the league's most skilled passers. Since 2013–14, Bäckström began a streak of six-consecutive 50-assist seasons, one of only 26 players to ever accomplish the feat. He has since gone on to become Washington's all-time franchise leader in assists, and is second in all-time franchise points behind teammate Alexander Ovechkin. Bäckström won the Stanley Cup with the Capitals in 2018 over the Vegas Golden Knights. He achieved the 1000th point milestone on March 9, 2022.

Early life
Bäckström was born and raised in Valbo, Sweden. His father, Anders, was a professional ice hockey player, who won a championship with the Brynäs and retired shortly after Bäckström was born. His mother was a handball player in Finland and Sweden.

According to his father, Bäckström "took over a pair of skates" from his older brother Kristoffer at the age of two. Young Bäckström put his first skates on inside, walking around on the floor inside, refusing to take them off come bedtime and his father stated that "they let him go to bed with his skates on", and that "those were his favorite things in the world." When Bäckström was three years old, "he could skate fully on his own. Like it was the most natural thing in the world," according to his father. His "latch onto" Kristoffer and his friends for "nightly informal games." Bäckström began playing for the local Valbo team when he was four, practicing daily from 5 to 6 p.m., then from after dinner until midnight. The "ice barn" in Valbo where he developed his hockey skills as a young boy has been renamed to Nickback Arena.

As a young player Bäckström focused on the mental part of the game. He stated that "I'm not a fast skater, but when I was younger I always wanted to be a smart player and try to read my opponent.”

Playing career

Early career
After turning 15, Bäckström began his junior career in the 2002–03 season, playing for Brynäs IF of the J20 SuperElit league. 
After playing parts of three seasons there, in the final of which he had 34 points in 29 games (17 goals and 17 assists), he was called up to play for the club's team in the Elitserien, Sweden's top professional hockey league. In part due to the increased competition brought about by the influx of NHL players into the league (as a result of the 2004–05 NHL lockout), Bäckström was unable to record a point.

In his second season, 2005–06, Bäckström's numbers greatly improved, posting 26 points (10 goals and 16 assists) in 46 games, including a goal in four playoff games. Quickly becoming a first-line centre and a top player on the team, he was named both the Elitserien Rookie of the Year as well as the Swedish Junior Hockey Player of the Year for the first of two times (other notable players to win the latter include Peter Forsberg, Henrik Lundqvist, Daniel Sedin, Henrik Sedin and Niklas Kronwall).

Following his successful campaign, Bäckström was drafted fourth overall by the Washington Capitals at the 2006 NHL Entry Draft, but announced on 10 July 2006, that he would wait a year before leaving Sweden to play in the NHL. His selection made him the fourth-highest drafted Swede at the time, after Mats Sundin (first), Daniel Sedin (second) and Henrik Sedin (third).

In his third and last season with Brynäs, in 2006–07, Bäckström's development had continued, and he saw improvements in points (12 goals and 28 assists) despite playing in one less game than the previous season. He also improved in post-season play, and was able to record six points (three goals three assists) in seven playoff games.

Washington Capitals
On 21 May 2007, Bäckström signed a three-year, entry-level contract with the Capitals to begin playing during the 2007–08 season. His development and impressive play led some, such as HockeysFuture.com, which ranks NHL prospects, to consider him the most talented Swedish prospect in recent history. Drawing comparisons to Peter Forsberg, he was noted primarily for his vision, passing and ability to maintain possession of the puck in traffic. For these reasons, he was expected to be a catalyst on the team's power play, and his defensive prowess and puck movement would make him an equally valuable asset when short-handed. On 5 October 2007, he scored his first NHL point, an assist on a goal by fellow Swede Michael Nylander, against the Atlanta Thrashers. While Bäckström was decent early in his first season, still adjusting to the smaller ice rinks of North America, his season rapidly improved once an injury to centre Michael Nylander promoted him to Washington's first line. Playing alongside Alexander Ovechkin, Bäckström set NHL and team records while helping Ovechkin win the Art Ross Trophy and the Maurice "Rocket" Richard Trophy.

Playing on the Capitals' top line, Bäckström would finish his rookie campaign with 69 points (14 goals and 55 assists), with three goals and 22 assists on the power play. For his play, he was named runner-up to the Chicago Blackhawks' Patrick Kane for the 2007–08 Calder Memorial Trophy, awarded annually to the League's top rookie of the season (Kane had 1,087 votes to Bäckström's 872). The Blackhawks' other star rookie, Jonathan Toews, placed third in votes with 647. Despite missing out on the award, Bäckström was named to the All-Rookie Team along with Kane and Toews.

In his second NHL season, 2008–09, Bäckström would go on to lead both the Capitals and all Swedish NHL players with 66 assists, also adding 22 goals, for 88 total points, placing him within the top ten NHL scorers for the year. Bäckström would again prove to be a force in the Stanley Cup playoffs, tallying 15 points in 14 games as Washington eventually fell to the future Stanley Cup champions, the Pittsburgh Penguins, in the Eastern Conference Semifinals.

Following the 2009 playoffs, Bäckström was awarded the Viking Award as the top Swedish-born player during the 2008–09 season. He became only the second Capital to ever win the award, following Calle Johansson, who won the award in 1991–92.

At the conclusion of the 2009–10 regular season, Bäckström finished fourth in NHL scoring with 101 points, behind Henrik Sedin (112), Sidney Crosby (109) and teammate Alexander Ovechkin (109). Bäckström scored his first career Stanley Cup playoff hat-trick, including the overtime game-winner, against the Montreal Canadiens in the first round of the 2010 playoffs, a series Washington ultimately lost in seven games. On 17 May, shortly after the end of the Capitals' season, Bäckström signed a ten-year, $67 million contract extension with the team.

At the conclusion of the 2010–11 season, Bäckström scored 65 points, his lowest single-season point total in the NHL.

On 17 April 2012, Bäckström received a one-game suspension for a cross-check to the head of Boston Bruins forward Rich Peverley.

During the 2012–13 NHL lockout, Bäckström played for Dynamo Moscow of the Kontinental Hockey League (KHL). On 18 October 2012, he signed with the Russian club, with whom his linemate Alexander Ovechkin had also signed for, for the duration of the 2012–13 lockout. Originally given the jersey number 99, he requested to change to a different number out of respect to Wayne Gretzky and was given number 69 by the club. Bäckström later returned to finish third in the NHL with 40 assists during the shortened 2012–13 season.

During the 2014–15 season, on 13 December 2014, Bäckström scored his first regular season NHL hat-trick in a game against the Tampa Bay Lightning. On 15 March 2015, in a game against the Boston Bruins, he became the Capitals' all-time franchise leader in assists, surpassing both Alexander Ovechkin and Michal Pivoňka after recording two in the game. Bäckström finished the season leading the NHL with 60 assists, including 33 on Ovechkin's League-leading 53 goals; Bäckström also finished the year with 78 points, sixth-best in the NHL. On 27 May, Bäckström had successful arthroscopic hip surgery, with Capitals management expectant of a full recovery prior to the beginning of the 2015–16 season, during which he recorded 20 goals and 50 assists as the Capitals were the best team overall during the regular season, and was selected for his first All-Star Game.

Bäckström, third on his team with 50 assists during the 2017–18 season, was third on the team with 10 assists during the playoffs, despite playing with an injury to his hand that kept him out of the first three games of the Eastern Conference Finals. The Capitals announced before Game 4 that he would be back in the lineup for Game 5 against the Pittsburgh Penguins. He left during Game 5 and missed the Game 6 victory in Pittsburgh.

Bäckström reached and surpassed 600 assists in a 23 October 2018 game against the Vancouver Canucks, and became the 87th player in NHL history to reach this mark. A pre-game ceremony was held for Bäckström for reaching 600 career assists on 7 November 2018, before the Capitals' game against the Pittsburgh Penguins. In a 4–1 win against the New York Islanders on 26 November, Bäckström recorded three assists and moved to the second place on the Capitals' all-time points list, passing Peter Bondra. In his next game, on 30 November, versus the New Jersey Devils, Bäckström scored his second career regular season hat-trick. On 11 December, Bäckström had his 12th career four-assist game in a 6–2 win over the Detroit Red Wings, tying him with Gilbert Perreault for eighth in NHL history.

On 14 January 2020, the Capitals signed Bäckström to a five-year, $46 million contract extension.

Bäckström reached 700 career assists on 5 March 2021, in a 5–1 loss to the Boston Bruins. The assist made him the third active NHL player with 700 assists, along with Joe Thornton and Sidney Crosby.

Bäckström scored his 1,000th career point on 9 March 2022 on an assist to T. J. Oshie against the Edmonton Oilers, becoming only the second player in Capitals history to reach that threshold after Ovechkin. On 18 June 2022, it was announced that Bäckström had undergone hip resurfacing surgery on his left hip, and was expected to be out for the start of the following season.

International play

Bäckström played his first game with Sweden on 6 April 2006, in a game against Norway. He won the World Championship when he represented Sweden in the 2006 World Championship. As of that tournament, he is the youngest Swedish player ever in an Ice Hockey World Championship tournament. Bäckström played the last four games in the World Championship (roster spot held open for Daniel Alfredsson) and was directly appointed to the first line together with idols Henrik Zetterberg and Johan Franzén.

Bäckström led Sweden in the 2010 Winter Olympics with six points in four games before they were eliminated by Slovakia in the quarterfinals.

In a drug test at the 2014 Winter Olympics, Bäckström's A-sample indicated doping due to an allergy medication containing pseudoephedrine. He was prevented from playing in the final as a result. The B-sample, analyzed after the final, also showed values above the allowed limit. The International Ice Hockey Federation (IIHF) opposed the decision to stop Bäckström from playing in the final. His silver medal was withheld until the International Olympic Committee (IOC) determined whether or not to award it to him. On 14 March 2014, the IOC Disciplinary Commission decided that Bäckström would be awarded the silver medal. The Commission confirmed the provisional suspension that rendered Bäckström ineligible for the final. However, in November 2014, the World Anti-Doping Agency (WADA) appealed the IOC decision to award Bäckström his silver medal. This appeal was resolved in January 2015 when Bäckström, the IOC, WADA and the IIHF agreed to a settlement in which he accepted a reprimand but was cleared of attempting to enhance his performance.

Personal life
Bäckström's father Anders is a Swedish hockey player who played his career for Brynäs IF, totaling ten seasons for the club. Nicklas' mother Catrin Bäckström (born in Finland) played handball in the Swedish and Finnish Elite League in the late 1970s and early 1980s. Nicklas' older brother Kristoffer is a former professional hockey player, who played the second tier of the Swedish league system with Hammarby IF, and in a German league. Bäckström and his wife, Liza Berg, have three children, two daughters and a son. The family lives in Arlington, Virginia, during the season. Bäckström is a keen football fan and an avid supporter of Arsenal F.C.

Career statistics

Regular season and playoffs
Bold indicates led league

International

Awards and honors

 Bäckström was given the Honorary Ambassador Award at the Swedish Embassy on 28 November 2018; award given annually to "high-profile individual who serves as a good role model for youth." Queen Silvia of Sweden was present at the "In Light of Youth" benefit dinner.

Records
 Youngest Swedish player ever in World Championship (18 years and 6 months).
 First NHL rookie to record four assists in two consecutive games.
 Most assists in a season by a rookie, Washington Capitals team record (56 assists), 2007–08 season.
 Most assists in Washington Capitals franchise with 722.

See also
 List of NHL players with 100-point seasons
 List of NHL players with 1,000 points
 List of NHL players with 1,000 games played

References

External links

1987 births
Brynäs IF players
Doping cases in ice hockey
HC Dynamo Moscow players
Ice hockey players at the 2010 Winter Olympics
Ice hockey players at the 2014 Winter Olympics
Living people
Medalists at the 2014 Winter Olympics
National Hockey League All-Stars
National Hockey League first-round draft picks
Olympic ice hockey players of Sweden
Olympic medalists in ice hockey
Olympic silver medalists for Sweden
People from Gävle Municipality
Stanley Cup champions
Swedish ice hockey centres
Swedish sportspeople in doping cases
Washington Capitals draft picks
Washington Capitals players
Sportspeople from Gävleborg County